The 1911 Tennessee Volunteers football team represented the University of Tennessee in the 1911 college football season.  Zora G. Clevenger served the first season of his five-year tenure as head coach.  Prior to coming to Tennessee, Clevenger coached at Nebraska Wesleyan University.

Schedule

References

Tennessee
Tennessee Volunteers football seasons
Tennessee Volunteers football